Gibberula japonica is a species of sea snail, a marine gastropod mollusk, in the family Cystiscidae.

References

japonica
Gastropods described in 1940